Chappa is a 1982 Malayalam film directed by P. A. Backer and starring Zainuddin (actor) Hari, Kunjandi and Beena. The film is about a lone individual's determined fight against tyranny. It won the National Film Award for Best Feature Film in Malayalam.This was the debut movie of actor Zainuddin (actor). He played a character named vasu in this movie.

Cast
Zainuddin (actor) as Vasu
Beena
Hari
Kunjandi

References

External links
 

1980s Malayalam-language films
Films directed by P. A. Backer
Best Malayalam Feature Film National Film Award winners